Andar (also Romanized as Andār) is a settlement in Tehran Province, Iran.

References

Populated places in Tehran Province